Nachtfalter is the second musical release of Mondsucht.

Track listing
"Nachtfalter (Club Version)"–
"Nachtfalter (Original)"–
"Beast"–
"Nachtfalter (M-Version)"–

Info
 All tracks written and produced by Mondsucht
 Male vocals by Robert N.
 Female vocals by Astrid M.

External links
 Mondsucht Discography Info

2001 albums
Mondsucht albums
Alice In... albums